Adeline André (born in 1949) is a French fashion designer and the head of one of the sixteen haute couture design houses in Paris.

Early life 
She was born in Bangui, French Equatorial Africa  in 1949 and studied at the Ecole de la Chambre Syndicale de la Couture Parisienne.  After her graduation in 1970 she entered the House of Christian Dior as an assistant for Haute Couture collections, working next Marc Bohan.

Career
In 1981 she formed her own designer house, Adeline André. That same year she also registered her most famous fashion innovation, the "three sleeve holes" at the French National Industrial Property Institute and 1982 at the World Intellectual Property Organization. Examples of this three sleeve holes garment are in the collections of French Fashion Museum, Palais Galliera in Paris, the Fashion Institute of Technology in New York and the Fashion and Design Museum in Lisbon.

In May 1997,  André became an 'invited member' of the Syndicate Chamber of Parisian Haute Couture and a 'permanent member' since January 2005. She is currently the head designer at the fashion house that bears her name.  André also teaches color at her alma mater, participates in gallery and museum exhibitions, and designs costumes for ballet, opera and theater.

References

External links

The Adeline André page at Infomat
The Adeline André page at Mode à Paris
Picts and video of Adeline André Haute Couture SS 2011 show

1949 births
Living people
Haute couture
French fashion designers
French women fashion designers
People from Bangui
Dior people